The American Society of Association Executives (ASAE) is the membership organization and voice of the association profession. Founded in 1920 and headquartered in Washington, D.C., ASAE has around 42,000 association CEOs, staff professionals, industry partners, and consultant members in around 7,400 organizations

The mission of the American Society of Association Executives is to promote the value of associations to society and to support the professionalism of the individuals who lead them. ASAE promotes this message through its advocacy platform, the Power of A.  ASAE is also the American sponsor of the Certified Association Executive (CAE) professional certification program.

In 1963, ASAE's board created the ASAE Foundation with the stated purpose "to advance the science of association management, to diffuse and cultivate knowledge and understanding of associations, and to uphold the high standards of associations generally."

ASAE Business Services, Inc. (ABSI), ASAE's wholly owned subsidiary, provides business solutions to the association community that help associations grow and prosper, save time and money, and simplify the business of running an association.

ASAE publishes Associations Now, a monthly journal with a daily news email.

Michelle Mason has been the president and chief executive officer of ASAE since September 2021.

See also
 Association management
 Nonprofit organization

References

External links
Official website

Organizations established in 1920
Professional associations based in the United States

1920 establishments in the United States

Non-profit organizations based in Washington, D.C.
501(c)(6) nonprofit organizations